The elm cultivar Ulmus 'Folia Variegata Pendula' is possibly one of a number of Ulmus × hollandica cultivars arising from the crossing of Wych Elm Ulmus glabra with Field Elm Ulmus minor.

Description
Described by C. de Vos in 1867, as a weak-growing tree, of unsatisfactory duration, but otherwise beautiful.

Cultivation
No specimens are known to survive.

References

Ulmus articles missing images
Ulmus
Missing elm cultivars